Debbie-Ann Parris-Thymes (born 24 March 1973 in Trelawny Parish) is a Jamaican athlete who mainly competes in the 400 metres hurdles event. She finished 4th in the 1996 Summer Olympics. She has also won medals in relay.

Parris-Thymes ran track collegiately at Louisiana State University and was elected to the Louisiana State University Athletic Hall of Fame in 2017.

Personal bests
400 metres - 51.42 (2001)
400 metres hurdles - 53.88 (2001)

Achievements

Coaching career
Parris-Thymes has been an assistant coach for the LSU Lady Tigers track and field team from 2005–present.

References

1973 births
Living people
People from Trelawny Parish
Jamaican female hurdlers
Jamaican female sprinters
Olympic athletes of Jamaica
Athletes (track and field) at the 1996 Summer Olympics
Athletes (track and field) at the 2004 Summer Olympics
Athletes (track and field) at the 1994 Commonwealth Games
Athletes (track and field) at the 2002 Commonwealth Games
Athletes (track and field) at the 2003 Pan American Games
Commonwealth Games bronze medallists for Jamaica
Commonwealth Games silver medallists for Jamaica
World Athletics Championships medalists
LSU Lady Tigers track and field athletes
LSU Tigers and Lady Tigers track and field coaches
Commonwealth Games medallists in athletics
Universiade medalists in athletics (track and field)
Goodwill Games medalists in athletics
Universiade gold medalists for Jamaica
Universiade silver medalists for Jamaica
World Athletics Championships winners
Medalists at the 1993 Summer Universiade
Competitors at the 1998 Goodwill Games
Competitors at the 2001 Goodwill Games
Central American and Caribbean Games medalists in athletics
Pan American Games competitors for Jamaica
21st-century Jamaican women
Medallists at the 1994 Commonwealth Games
Medallists at the 2002 Commonwealth Games